Richard Frederick Davis (born 14 November 1943) is an English retired footballer who played as a full-back for various clubs in the 1960s.

Football career

Plymouth Argyle
Davis was born in Plymouth, Devon and joined his local club, Plymouth Argyle as a trainee in August 1960, going on to sign as a professional a year later on his 18th birthday. Described as "a strongly built left-back", Davis made his first-team debut in a 3–2 defeat at Derby County on 20 Mar 1963. In his second match, Davis came up against Stanley Matthews of Stoke City, going down to another defeat. Despite being on the losing side in both his opening matches, Davis retained his place for the rest of the season.

He started the 1963–64 season playing six of the first eight games, before losing his place to Wilf Carter. After another five league matches between late-November and mid-January, of which four were defeats, Davis returned to the reserves, with the long-serving Bryce Fulton taking over at left-back. In his two seasons as a professional with Argyle, Davis made a total of 24 appearances.

Southampton
Davis joined fellow Second Division side Southampton in July 1964. He spent most of his time at The Dell in the reserves and made his solitary first-team appearance away to his former club on 17 February 1965, losing 4–0 as the "Saints" were "outplayed fore and aft" by Argyle, with Mike Trebilcock scoring twice.

Later career
Davis left Southampton in July 1965 to join Bristol City where he made only eight appearances in a four-year spell before joining Barrow in March 1969 where he made 50 appearances before dropping down to non-league football in the summer of 1970.

He played for Falmouth Town between 1973 and 1976 and had a second spell at the club, from 1979 to 1981, as a player manager. He later assisted Plymouth Argyle in their School of Excellence and was also a physical education teacher in Plymouth for over 20 years.

References

1943 births
Footballers from Plymouth, Devon
Living people
English footballers
Association football defenders
English Football League players
Plymouth Argyle F.C. players
Southampton F.C. players
Bristol City F.C. players
Barrow A.F.C. players
Falmouth Town A.F.C. players